Giovanni Galbieri (born 8 January 1993) is an Italian sprinter.

Biography
He won the bronze medal over 100 metres at the 2009 World Youth Championships in Athletics.

Achievements

References

External links
 

1993 births
Living people
Italian male sprinters